North Cape is the northernmost point of New Zealand's main islands. It is also used to refer to the whole larger headland stretching about five kilometres from Murimotu Island westwards to Kerr Point and including the Surville Cliffs. Statistics New Zealand uses a statistical area called North Cape for population data, extending south down the Aupouri Peninsula to the Houhora Heads.

North Cape, one of the four New Zealand Cardinal Capes, was named by James Cook, Commander of Endeavour in its 1769–1770 voyage. At the time the other Cardinal Capes were named Cape East, West Cape and Cape South.

North Cape was once an island formed by a marine volcano. Sand deposited by ocean currents eventually formed a tombolo known as Waikuku Flat, which joined the island to the rest of the Aupouri Peninsula. The headland and flat combined now form the North Cape Peninsula.

A large part of North Cape is enclosed in the North Cape Scientific Reserve. The reserve’s purpose is to protect the unique flora and fauna of the area, some of it endemic to a small area on Surville Cliffs. An electrified fence was erected in 2000 to create a mainland island by excluding the possums, feral pigs and semi-wild horses of the area. The reserve is closed to the public and managed by the Department of Conservation (DoC).

Much of Waikuku Flat is in another DoC reserve, the Mokaikai Scenic Reserve, which stretches south to Parengarenga Harbour. This reserve is open to the public but land access is via an area in Māori tribal ownership and a permit is required from the controlling Māori body to cross the land. Another strip of Māori land lies between the Mokaikai reserve and the North Cape reserve. This strip includes the southern part of North Cape and the northern edge of Waikuku Flat. It stretches from Kerr Point and the north end of Tom Bowling Bay on the north coast across to Tokatoka Point on the west coast.

Surville Cliffs

Hikura / de Surville Cliffs is the northernmost point of the mainland of New Zealand, located at the tip of North Cape. In the past the cliffs have sometimes been referred to as Kerr Point but true Kerr Point lies a short distance away at the western end of North Cape. The first European discovery of the cliffs was made by Jean-François-Marie de Surville in December 1769, when he sailed his ship St Jean Baptiste to New Zealand to find a safe anchorage to care for sick crew. He found them only a few days before they were seen by James Cook.

The cliffs expose 1.2 square kilometres of serpentinised peridotite mafic rocks. They form a unique environment that supports a number of threatened and endangered plants endemic to the area, including:
 Pittosporum ellipticum subsp. serpentinum
 Hebe brevifolia
 Hebe ligustrifolia
 Helichrysum aggregatum
 Leucopogon xerampelinus
 Pimelea tomentosa (sand daphne)
 Phyllocladus trichomanoides (tanekaha)
 Pseudopanax lessonii (coastal fivefinger)
 Uncinia perplexa (Surville Cliffs bastard grass)

References

Far North District
Headlands of the Northland Region
Volcanoes of the Northland Region
Tombolos